Hendric may be a given name and refer to:

 George Hendric Houghton (1820-1897), American theologian
 Hendric van Alckmer (15th century), Middle Dutch writer
 Hendric Mendez (1987- Present), IBEX Member.

See also 

 Hendrick (disambiguation)
 Hendricks (disambiguation)
 Hendrickx
 Hendrik (disambiguation)
 Hendriks
 Hendrikx
 Hendrix (disambiguation)
 Hendryx
 Henrik
 Henry (disambiguation)
 Henryk (given name)